Cranbourne is a city in Melbourne, Victoria, Australia, 43 km south-east of Melbourne's Central Business District, located within the City of Casey local government area. Cranbourne recorded a population of 21,281 at the 2021 census.

The ever expanding greater Cranbourne area consists of Cranbourne, Cranbourne North, Cranbourne East, Cranbourne South, Victoria and Cranbourne West.

History

Prior to European settlement the Cranbourne area is thought to have been occupied by the Boonwurrung Aboriginal people. The first white settlers, the Ruffy brothers, arrived in 1836. They later opened the Cranbourne Inn. 

The area was greatly opened up by settlers from the 1860s. Cranbourne Post Office had opened on 1 August 1857.

Progress in developing the land around Cranbourne was hampered by the Koo Wee Rup swampland. However William Lyall (who bought land in the swamp area) assisted in coordinating the draining of the swamp to make it usable as farmland.

Cranbourne was, from 1860 until 1994, the administrative centre of the Shire of Cranbourne, (known for most of 1994 as the City of Cranbourne). The council building is still in existence, and is now used as a health care centre known as 'The Cranbourne Integrated Care Centre'. Prior to 1978, Council met at the Old Shire Offices, on the corner of Sladen Street and South Gippsland Highway.

Population

At the 2006 census Cranbourne had a population of 14,750. At the 2016 census, Cranbourne had a population of 20,094.

62.3% of people were born in Australia. The next most common countries of birth were India 5.4%, England 3.3%, New Zealand 3.1%, Afghanistan 1.9% and Philippines 1.4%. 68.5% of people spoke only English at home. Other languages spoken at home included Punjabi 2.6%, Hazaraghi 1.2%, Samoan 1.2%, Hindi 1.2% and Dari 1.1%. The most common responses for religion were No Religion 28.8%, Catholic 21.3% and Anglican 10.2%.

Places

In the south of Cranbourne is the Royal Botanic Gardens, Cranbourne, and the Cranbourne Racecourse & Recreation Reserve. Cranbourne also contains the Cranbourne Golf Club, the Amstel Golf Club, the Ranfurlie Golf Club and an indoor swimming pool.
 The Casey Complex was opened in December 1994 by the former City of Cranbourne. It is located off Berwick Cranbourne Road, and features a wide variety of community facilities, including The Shed (an indoor skating facility), the Cranbourne Indoor Sports Centre (basketball, netball, and indoor soccer), the Cranbourne Branch of the Casey-Cardinia Library Corporation. It also is home to YMCA Casey Race, the local swimming pool for Cranbourne which contains two 50m lap pools, children's recreational pool, heated rehabilitation pool, spa, sauna, steam room, full gym and weights room as well as two water slides.
 The Factory – Rehearsal Centre for the Arts (Cranbourne, Caseyville (traffic school) and Bowland (a ten-pin bowling complex) 24 lanes.
 The new Cranbourne Multicultural Community Centre is set to open in early 2007.  Contractors, on behalf of Casey City Council are currently building a new indoor swimming complex which will open in mid-2009. It will include a new wave pool, main lap pool (50m), slides and a hydrotherapy pool. This will be based next to the Casey Complex.  Along Berwick-Cranbourne Road is the new Casey Fields Complex

Schools

Some schools are:
 Alkira Secondary College (formerly known as Casey Central Secondary College),
 Casey Fields Primary School
 Cranbourne Carlisle Primary School
 St. Peter's College (West and East campus)
 St. Agatha's Catholic School,
 St. Therese's Catholic Primary School,
 Cranbourne Secondary College,
 Lyndhurst Secondary College (formerly known as Cranbourne Meadows Technical School),
 Casey Grammar School (formerly known as Cranbourne Christian College),
 Cranbourne Primary School,
 Cranbourne North East Primary School,
 Cranbourne East Primary School,
 Cranbourne East Secondary College,
 Lyndhurst Primary School,
 Marnebek School,
 Hillsmeade Primary School,
 Cranbourne Park Primary School,
 Cranbourne West Primary School,
 Rangebank Primary School,
 Courtenay Gardens Primary School,
 Cranbourne Specialist School.
 Chisholm Institute of TAFE also has a campus in Cranbourne, to the city's east. To cater for the growth in Cranbourne several primary schools have been proposed.

Entertainment

FReZza or Spectrum Entertainment run occasional youth programs including All Ages music events, charity programs and other youth services. Over the years a number of local artists have emerged that have featured at many of Spectrum Entertainment's live events. These include bands such as Josh Wins Again, Arpejio, Closure in Moscow, Ellora just to name a few who have all hailed from Cranbourne or the City of Casey

Shopping

Cranbourne has two major shopping precincts. In the north of Cranbourne, on the corner of Thompson Road and the South Gippsland Highway is the Thompson Parkway Shopping Centre (anchored by Woolworths) and Cranbourne Homemaker Centre complex with JB Hi-Fi Home, The Good Guys, Officeworks, La Porchetta, Hungry Jacks and more major stores. This complex has largely developed around the Bunnings Warehouse located on the corner.
In the centre of town is High Street and Cranbourne Park Shopping Centre (formerly known as Centro Cranbourne), anchored by a 17 aisle Coles Supermarket, an 8 aisle Woolworths supermarket (Closed 2020, replaced by TK Maxx), Kmart, Target, JB Hi-Fi Home, Harris Scarfe, Manchester and More, Best & Less, Reject Shop, and Priceline. The centre previously included a 5-cinema complex.
Smaller shopping centres include the Sandhurst Shopping Centre anchored by an 11 aisle Coles Supermarket in Cranbourne West, Springhill shopping centre including coles and Urban Chill Cafe located Thompsons Road Cranbourne North and Hunt Club Village Shopping Centre in Cranbourne East with Woolworths, Aldi and 17 speciality stores.
Other supermarkets include an Aldi Supermarket in Bakewell Street.

Churches

Cranbourne is home to several churches. These include the Cranbourne Salvation Army, Cranbourne Baptist Church, the Anglican Regional Church Cranbourne, Cranbourne Regional Uniting Church, Freedom Christian Church(Assemblies of God), Deeper Christian Life Ministry(Deeper Life Bible Church), Cranbourne Presbyterian Church, St Agathas Catholic Church, Life Community Church, TurningPoint Church and the Cranbourne Ward of The Church of Jesus Christ of Latter-day Saints. Cranbourne North has Hope Christian Centre.

Sports facilities and clubs

Australian Football/Cricket
Casey Demons, a team in the Victorian Football League, plays its home games at Casey Fields. The Casey Demons, formerly the Casey Scorpions, were formerly the Springvale Football Club.
There are 9 Australian football/cricket ovals available at J&P Camm Reserve (2 ovals), the Donnelly Recreation Reserve (2 ovals), the Clyde Recreation Reserve (1 oval), the Lawson Poole Reserve (2 ovals), the Junction Village Reserve (1 oval) and the Glover Recreation Reserve (1 oval). Eight of the nine ovals each have a synthetic centre cricket wicket.  The Cranbourne Cricket Club was established in 1881 with the Cranbourne Football Club established in 1889.
There are 2 rugby fields at the Lawson Poole Reserve (1 field) and the Clyde Recreation Reserve (1 field).
Sports reserves
The town has an Australian Rules football team competing in the Outer East Football Netball League.

Football (Soccer)
Casey Comets Football Club were founded in 1975 as Cranbourne Comets Football Club and changed to Casey Comets Football Club in 2007. Casey play at Comets Stadium on O'Tooles Road in Cranbourne. As of 2020, the Men's senior teams compete in the Football Federation Victoria State League 1 South-East league, and the Women's senior team compete in the Football Federation Victoria State League 1.

Basketball and Netball
There are 6 basketball courts available at the Terry Vickerman Centre at the Casey Indoor Leisure Complex (shared netball). There is a netball court the Glover Recreation Reserve (1 outdoor court).

Tennis
There are 32 tennis courts available at Cranbourne Tennis Club, Cranbourne Racecourse & Recreation Reserve (6 porous) and Casey Fields (10 poly clay and 2 plexipave); the Clyde Tennis Club, Clyde Recreation Reserve (6 plexipave); the Devon Meadows Tennis Club, Glover Recreation Reserve (6 poly clay); and the Cranbourne South Tennis Club, Morning Mist Recreation Reserve (2 artificial grass; 2 plexipave). There are an additional 8 courts (sand-filled artificial grass) available inside the Terry Vickerman Centre at the Casey Indoor Leisure Complex.

Golf

There are two golf courses privately owned and managed; Ranfurlie Golf Club (members course). and Cranbourne Golf Club (public course).

Horse Riding

Club-based horse riding is available at the Morning Mist Recreation Reserve in Cranbourne South around 15 minutes from the city centre.

Horse and Greyhound Racing

Cranbourne has a three code sport facility known as the Cranbourne Racing Centre and Racecourse. This hosts the horse racing club called the Cranbourne Turf Club, which schedules around 22 race meetings a year including the Cranbourne Cup meeting in October. The second code is the Harness Racing Club which conducts regular meetings at its racetrack and the third code is the Cranbourne Greyhound Racing Club, which holds regular meetings.

Lawn Bowls

Two lawn bowls club facilities are available at the Cranbourne Bowls Club (Cranbourne Racecourse & Recreation Reserve) and the Cranbourne RSL Bowls Club.

Shooting

Shooting facilities are available at the Cranbourne Dandenong Pistol Club (Cranbourne Racecourse & Recreation Reserve). The Cranbourne RSL Gun Club (Thompsons Road, Cranbourne North) was demolished in late 2006, the Victorian Deer Association now meet at Akoonah Park in Berwick.

Skating/BMX

There are skating and BMX facilities available at the Merinda Park (outdoor skate park).

Events

The MRA Cranbourne GP Run is held each year on the Saturday of the Australian Motorcycle Grand Prix.

 Casey Radio 97.7FM

Public transport

The current terminus of the Cranbourne railway line is at Cranbourne railway station. The Cranbourne line is part of the South Gippsland Railway, which is currently disused between Cranbourne and the start of the private South Gippsland Tourist Railway in Nyora (now closed). The Cranbourne Line was to be extended by 2 km to Cranbourne East by 2015, as stated in the Victorian Transport Plan, but nothing has been done so far to show progress of the line extension. As of February 2022, the railway is duplicated. An extension of the line to Clyde was announced in 2021, as part of the Cranbourne Line Upgrade, with construction expected to begin around 2025.

The restoration and reopening of the disused line was proposed by the Victorian Government in 2001, at which time the government described the line as being in a state of significant disrepair. By 2008, a report had concluded that the rail service to Leongatha would not be restored due to the high cost in returning services. Instead, extra money will be spent on improving road coach services.

Cranbourne also has many bus services that help commuters travel to its surrounding suburbs.

See also
 City of Cranbourne – Cranbourne was previously within this former local government area.

References

External links
 Cranbourne Area Recreation Facilities Study, City of Casey

Cities in Victoria (Australia)
Suburbs of Melbourne
Suburbs of the City of Casey